Tommy Söderberg (born 19 August 1948) is a Swedish football manager and coach.

Career
As a manager, he won the Swedish league title with AIK in 1992. Later he went on to coach the Swedish U21 national team, and when Tommy Svensson left his job as national team manager in 1998, the path was open for Söderberg. He took Sweden to the Euro 2000 tournament. The same year Lars Lagerbäck was promoted from assistant coach to joint coach together with Söderberg.

Under management of the new coaching duo, Sweden qualified for the 2002 FIFA World Cup and Euro 2004. During the 2004 European Championship, Söderberg decided to leave his position after the tournament and return to coach the U21 team, which he later managed together with Jörgen Lennartsson.

References

External links
Profile at the Swedish football association

Living people
1948 births
Swedish footballers
AIK Fotboll managers
2002 FIFA World Cup managers
Sommar (radio program) hosts
Sweden national football team managers
Swedish football managers
UEFA Euro 2000 managers
UEFA Euro 2004 managers
Djurgårdens IF Fotboll managers
IF Brommapojkarna managers
Association footballers not categorized by position
Footballers from Stockholm